Push the Button is the fifth studio album by English electronic music duo The Chemical Brothers, first released in January 2005.

The album received mostly positive reviews from music critics and won the Grammy Award for Best Electronic/Dance Album in January 2006. It was certified gold by the BPI on 28 January 2005.

Development
The making of the album started in mid-2003. Most of the album was finished in the last couple of months.

Singles
"Galvanize" was the first single from the album, released on 22 November 2004 in the United States and on 17 January 2005 in the United Kingdom. It peaked at number three on the UK Singles Chart. "Believe" was the second single from the album, released on 2 May 2005. It peaked at number 18. "The Boxer" was the third single from the album, released on 11 July 2005. It peaked at number 41.

Live 05 was released as a digital EP promoting the album on 29 November 2005. It was recorded live from their 2005 tour.

Usage in media

 Track No. 1, "Galvanize", has been featured in US commercials for Budweiser, as well as on an episode of All Star Family Fortunes aired 23 December 2006. A remix, produced by Scratch Perverts, was included in the game DJ Hero 2. It was also used in Need for Speed: Most Wanted in 2012. It was also used in an ad by Oculus to promote their Quest 2 model, the ad was entitled "Break free" and published in 2020. Also in 2012, it was used to start the entrance of the athletes at the opening ceremony of the London 2012 Summer Olympics
 Track No. 6, "The Big Jump", was featured on the soundtracks of the video games Burnout Revenge and Project Gotham Racing 3.
 Track No. 9, "Shake Break Bounce" was used in the BBC Three comedy Cuckoo in the episode "Ken on E". 4 time Commonwealth gold medalist, Claudia Fragapane also used Shake Break Bounce as her floor exercise music during 2013 and 2014. It was also used as the background music to the Ford S-Max TV advert, shown in the UK in August–September 2006
 Track No. 10 "Marvo Ging", featured in Season two of The O.C., in the episode The Risky Business. It is also used on Channel 4, E4 and More4 in the United Kingdom to advertise Film4, and in the final episode of Time Trumpet.
 Track No. 11, "Surface to Air", was featured on Sky Sports News as its title music and in Anna Faris's 2007 comedy film Smiley Face.

Reception

Push the Button received very positive reviews by music critics upon its release. BBC Music said of the album "The Chemical Brothers return with their rebel rockin' fifth studio album that blows all stylistic boundaries down in the process." Lead single "Galvanize", with Q-Tip on lead vocals, peaked at number 3 in the UK Singles Chart. "The Boxer" also charted in the UK Singles Chart, in addition to "Believe".

Complex called it a "remotely forgettable project."

Track listing

Note
 As with all other albums by The Chemical Brothers, some of the tracks segue into the next. These are 2 into 3, 3 into 4, 5 into 6, 6 into 7, 7 into 8, 9 into 10, and finally 10 into 11.

Sample credits
 "Galvanize" contains samples of "Just Tell Me the Truth", written and performed by Najat Aatabou.
 "Come Inside" contains samples of "Everyday We Die a Little", written and performed by Sara Ayers.
 "Left Right" contains samples of "Heavy Dramatic Track", from Production Music Beds MM123.
 "Shake Break Bounce" contains samples of "Party & Bullshit", written by Rashia Fisher, Justin Smith and Curtis Jones, and performed by Rah Digga.

Personnel
Credits for Push the Button adapted from album liner notes.

The Chemical Brothers
 Tom Rowlands – production
 Ed Simons – production

Additional musicians
 Q-Tip – vocals on "Galvanize"
 Tim Burgess – vocals on "The Boxer"
 Kele Okereke – vocals on "Believe"
 Anna-Lynne Williams – vocals on "Hold Tight London"
 Jon Brookes – percussion on "Hold Tight London"
 Anwar Superstar – vocals on "Left Right"
 The Magic Numbers – vocals on "Close Your Eyes"

Additional technical personnel
 Cheeky Paul – editing
 Steve Dub – engineering
 Ben Thackery – engineering (assistant)
 Mike Marsh – mastering
 Vaughn Merrick – recording on "Galvanize"

Design
 The Chemical Brothers – art direction
 Tappin Gofton – art direction
 Kam Tang – artwork

Charts

Weekly charts

Year-end charts

Certifications

Release history

References

The Chemical Brothers albums
2005 albums
Astralwerks albums
Virgin Records albums
Grammy Award for Best Dance/Electronica Album